The 1955 NCAA Skiing Championships were contested in Northfield, Vermont at the second annual NCAA-sanctioned ski tournament to determine the individual and team national champions of men's collegiate alpine skiing, cross-country skiing, and ski jumping in the United States.

Denver, coached by Willy Schaeffler, repeated as national champions, topping Dartmouth in the team standings.

Highlights
As a result of the event's location in the East, six programs participated for the first time: Dartmouth, Middlebury, New Hampshire, Norwich, Vermont, and Williams
Two new individual titles were added to the championship: Alpine (downhill, slalom) and Nordic (cross country, jumping)
Dartmouth's Chiharu Igaya, a Japanese national, claimed three of the individual titles: alpine, downhill, and slalom
Denver ski jumper Willis Olson repeated as national champion in his event, the first collegiate skier to accomplish this feat

Venue

This year's championships were contested in Vermont at the Norwich University Ski Area in Northfield. The second edition, it was the first in the Eastern United States.

Team scoring

(H) = Hosts
Idaho sent only two competitors; three were required for the team competition.

Individual events
Four events were held, which yielded seven individual titles.

References

NCAA Skiing Championships
NCAA Skiing Championships
NCAA Skiing Championships
1955 in alpine skiing
1955 in cross-country skiing
1955 in ski jumping
Skiing in Vermont